During the 1997–98 English football season, AFC Bournemouth competed in the Football League Second Division.

Season summary
In the 1997–98 season, Bournemouth finished again mid-table in 9th place. The main highlight of their season was the Cherries reaching the Football League Trophy final against Grimsby Town but ended up losing 2–1 to a golden goal in their first Wembley appearance.

Final league table

Results
Bournemouth's score comes first

Legend

Football League Second Division

FA Cup

League Cup

Football League Trophy

Squad

References

AFC Bournemouth seasons
AFC Bournemouth